Gahima may refer to:

 Kanyarwanda I Gahima I, a King of Rwanda
 Gerald Gahima, a judge with the War Crimes Chamber of the Court of Bosnia-Herzegovina
 Yuhi wa II Gahima II, Mwami of the Kingdom of Rwanda during the fifteenth century